Voice of Truth may refer to:

 Voice of Truth (broadcast), a broadcast of Radio Missions
 "Voice of Truth" (song), a song by Casting Crowns